Ronald Lancaster (October 14, 1938 – September 18, 2008) was an American-Canadian professional football player and coach in the Canadian Football League (CFL). As the starting quarterback for the Saskatchewan Roughriders for 16 seasons, he led the team to its first Grey Cup championship in 1966 and is the franchise's all-time leader in passing yards, attempts, completions, touchdowns, and interceptions. At the time of his retirement, he was the CFL's career leader in passing yards and still ranks sixth overall as of 2016. After his retirement as a player, he served as a head coach and general manager in the CFL; he led his teams to two Grey Cups and currently ranks fourth all-time with 142 regular season wins. He was also a colour commentator on the CFL on CBC from 1981 to 1990. At the time of his death, he was the Senior Director of Football Operations of the Hamilton Tiger-Cats. He is a member of the Canadian Football Hall of Fame (1982), Canada's Sports Hall of Fame (1985) and the Wittenberg University Athletic Hall of Honour (1985).

Early life
Lancaster was born in the Pittsburgh area industrial town of Fairchance, Pennsylvania and moved to nearby Clairton as a young boy. At the time of his death, his mother still resided in Clairton.

Playing career
Lancaster was a talented quarterback by the time he graduated from Clairton High School, but because he was 5′5″ (165 cm), he was ignored by most college scouts. He attended tiny Wittenberg University and led its team to a 25-8-1 record between 1956 and 1959, and two Ohio Athletic Conference championships in 1957 and 1958.

By the time he graduated from Wittenberg he had grown to 5’10". His college coach had a friend with the Ottawa Rough Riders in the Canadian Football League (CFL), and Lancaster signed with them. During his rookie season in 1960, Lancaster shared the quarterbacking duties with another future Hall of Famer, Russ Jackson, and also played defensive back. The Ottawa Rough Riders won the Grey Cup that season. 

In 1963 Lancaster's playing rights were sold to the Saskatchewan Roughriders for $500 with the stipulation that if Saskatchewan ever wanted to trade him, Ottawa would have the first right of refusal.

It was with Saskatchewan that "The Little General" found his stride. In 16 seasons with the Roughriders (1963–1978), he led the team into the playoffs 14 consecutive years and made it to the CFL's Western Football Conference final 12 times. During that period, Saskatchewan played for the Grey Cup five times (1966, 1967, 1969, 1972, and 1976) and won it once, in 1966, when they defeated Lancaster's former team, the Ottawa Rough Riders, 29–14.

In Lancaster's career with the Saskatchewan Roughriders, he won 170 games as quarterback, and had only one losing record, 4–11–1 in 1978, his last season as a player.

He was the first quarterback in CFL history to reach 50,000 career passing yards, won the Schenley Award as most outstanding player in 1970 and 1976, was an All-Canadian in 1970, 1973, 1975 and 1976 and a Western all-star in 1966, 1968, 1969, 1970, 1973, 1975 and 1976.

In November 2006, the Canadian sports network TSN ranked Lancaster seventh on its list of Top 50 Players of the CFL's modern era.

At the time of his death, thirty years after his retirement as a player, he was still ranked in the top three in career statistics in a number of categories:
 second in touchdown passes (333, surpassed at the time only by Damon Allen) [Eight months after Lancaster's death, Anthony Calvillo moved past Lancaster into second place.]
 third in pass completions (3,384)
 third in pass attempts (6,233)
 third in yards passing (50,535)

Career statistics

Coaching career
Lancaster was a player-coach of the Saskatchewan Roughriders in the 1977 and 1978 seasons and also served as Saskatchewan's offensive co-ordinator.

He became Saskatchewan's head coach in 1979 but found, as one writer put it, that "the glorious fifties and sixties were over, and he was the first Roughrider coach in sixteen years who did not have Ron Lancaster at quarterback." The Roughriders finished 2–14 in 1979 and 2-14 in 1980.  Lancaster would not coach again for eleven years.

After serving as a colour commentator for The CFL on CBC from 1981 to 1990, he became head coach of the Edmonton Eskimos on February 4, 1991.  From 1991 to 1997, he had a record of 83–42 in the regular season and a Grey Cup win in 1993.  He passed Hugh Campbell's team record for wins on October 27, 1996.

Lancaster signed on to the Hamilton Tiger-Cats as head coach on November 26, 1997. Between 1998 and 2003, he took the team to the Grey Cup twice (1998 and 1999), winning it in 1999. On July 10, 2006, Lancaster was re-hired as the team's head coach on an interim basis after the firing of Greg Marshall.

At the time of his death, Lancaster’s 142 career regular-season wins placed him fourth on the CFL’s career regular season wins list.

CFL coaching record

Broadcasting career
CBC Television signed Lancaster as a colour commentator on CFL broadcasts in 1980. He was part of a trio that included Don Wittman doing the play-by-play and former Argonaut head coach Leo Cahill doing colour commentary (Cahill left after the 1985 season). He was with the CBC from 1981 to 1990 and was a member of the CBC team at the 1988 Summer Olympics in Seoul, Korea as the play-by-play broadcaster for basketball.

Illness and death
In 2004, Lancaster was diagnosed with bladder cancer, but appeared to have beaten it after treatment. In 2008, he was diagnosed with lung cancer and immediately started treatment. Lancaster was positive in his outlook, saying, "Five years ago, I survived a battle with cancer, and now we have another battle on our hands. The goal is to get this taken care of and move forward just like I did five years ago. We will approach this the same way as then and I thank you all in advance for your kindness as I am on my path to recovery." Six weeks later, on September 18, 2008, Lancaster died of a heart attack. He was survived by his wife, Bev, his three children Lana, Ron, and Bob, and four grandchildren.

At the 2008 CFL season Awards ceremony on November 20, 2008, he was posthumously awarded the Commissioner's Award for outstanding contribution to the CFL by Commissioner Mark Cohon.

See also
List of gridiron football quarterbacks passing statistics
List of Canadian Football League head coaches by wins

References
Notes

Sources
 CFL Facts, Figures and Records 2007.
 Official WFC, EFC and CFL statistics 1960 to 1978.
 "Ronald Lancaster". The Canadian Encyclopedia

1938 births
2008 deaths
American color commentators
American emigrants to Canada
American football quarterbacks
American players of Canadian football
American television sports announcers
Canadian Football Hall of Fame inductees
Canadian Football League announcers
Canadian Football League Most Outstanding Player Award winners
Canadian football quarterbacks
Canadian television sportscasters
Deaths from lung cancer
Edmonton Elks coaches
Hamilton Tiger-Cats coaches
Hamilton Tiger-Cats general managers
Olympic Games broadcasters
Ottawa Rough Riders players
People from Clairton, Pennsylvania
Players of American football from Pennsylvania
Saskatchewan Roughriders players
Sportspeople from Hamilton, Ontario
Sportspeople from the Pittsburgh metropolitan area
Wittenberg Tigers football players